Rainbow Farm was a pro-marijuana campground in Newberg Township, Cass County, Michigan, United States, that was involved in a fatal police standoff on September 3, 2001. The campground was run by Tom Crosslin and his life partner Rolland "Rollie" Rohm, and was home to two annual festivals, "HempAid" and "Roach Roast", which ran from 1996 through 2001. The operation ended with the burning down of all the structures on the property and the deaths of both Crosslin and Rohm.

Background 
Starting in 1996, Rainbow Farm began hosting two annual events, "HempAid" (on Memorial Day) and "Roach Roast" (on Labor Day). Guests included  Tommy Chong, High Times editor Steve Hager, Merle Haggard, members of Big Brother and the Holding Company, and more.  These events from 1996 through 2001 made Rainbow Farm the center of marijuana activism in Michigan. It was listed by High Times magazine as "fourteenth on the list of twenty-five Top Stoner Travel Spots in the world".

Investigation and arrests
Rainbow Farm was the focus of an investigation by Cass County prosecutor Scott Teter. A Rainbow Farm festival was linked to the death of a Berrien County teenager killed April 21, 2001, after his car crashed into a school bus carrying Eau Claire High School students. After a few months of unsuccessfully trying to gather evidence using undercover police officers, the investigation eventually came to a head in early May 2001, when Michigan State Police troopers served a tax-fraud warrant and found more than 200 marijuana plants.

Crosslin and Rohm were arrested on felony manufacture and weapons charges, and Rohm's son, Robert, was taken into foster care. Crosslin was charged with felony possession of a firearm, growing marijuana, and maintaining a drug house. He faced 20 years in prison and was out of jail on a $150,000 bail bond, as the state was moving to seize Rainbow Farm under civil asset forfeiture proceedings. During this time Crosslin publicly violated his bail agreement by announcing that he would throw another festival.

Standoff
In August 2001, Crosslin and Rohm failed to appear at their appointed court date, and set fire to a building on their property. Crosslin and Rohm also began procuring assault rifles and claiming that the farm had been mined and booby-trapped. Believing they were outgunned, the local authorities called in the FBI. The Michigan State Police and FBI agents surrounded Crosslin's house on August 31. Throughout Labor Day weekend Crosslin and Rohm systematically burned down the ten structures on their farm, shot at and hit a news helicopter filming the fires, shot at and missed a police surveillance plane, and sprayed the woods bordering the  property with gunfire to keep police at bay. 

On September 3, Crosslin walked into the woods on his farm, and while walking back he spotted an FBI agent lying on the ground. Crosslin raised his rifle and was shot in the forehead and died instantly. The autopsy report said Crosslin was shot five times in the head, and three times in the torso. At 3:45 a.m. on September 4, Rohm asked that his son be brought to see him and told police that if he was, he would surrender at 7 a.m.. Shortly after 6 a.m., a fire was reported at the Rainbow Farm residence. While walking outside the house Rohm was shot dead by another police marksman. A third man, Brandon J. Peoples, suffered minor injuries when Crosslin was shot.

See also 
Waco Siege 
Bundy Ranch 
Ruby Ridge 
Recapture Canyon 
Montana Freemen

References

Further reading

External links
 Memorial Site for Rainbow Farm: Vandalia, Michigan
 In-Depth 2003 Playboy Article

Landmarks in Michigan
Conflicts in 2001
Law enforcement operations in the United States
Cannabis in Michigan
Deaths by firearm in Michigan
Killings by law enforcement officers in the United States